George S. Merry (June 7, 1863 – May 15, 1935) was an American politician who served as a member of the South Dakota House of Representatives from 1921 until 1922.

Background
Merry was born George Schuyler Merry on June 7, 1863 in Weyauwega, Wisconsin. His brother, William E. Merry, served as a member of the South Dakota Senate. George Merry served as a member of the South Dakota House of Representatives from 1921 to 1922. He was a Republican.

Personal life 
On January 27, 1892, Merry married Anna Lydia Jackson. She died in 1912. He later married Nellie G. Adcock on June 1, 1921. Merry died on May 15, 1935 in Dell Rapids, South Dakota.

References

People from Weyauwega, Wisconsin
Republican Party members of the South Dakota House of Representatives
1863 births
1935 deaths
People from Dell Rapids, South Dakota